is a 2011 Japanese drama film directed by Izuru Narushima, based on author Mitsuyo Kakuta's novel. The film was a critical success, winning 10 awards at the 35th Japan Academy Prize, including Best Picture, Best Director, Best Leading Actress, Best Supporting Actress, and Best Script.

Plot
A woman named Kiwako (Hiromi Nagasaku) abducts a baby from a man with whom she has had an affair. For four years Kiwako has raised the child as her own until she gets arrested. The child named Erina is then returned to her birth parents, but she can't find peace. As an adult, Erina (Mao Inoue) also has an affair with a married man and gets pregnant. To confront her past, Erina goes to Shodoshima where she has lived with Kiwako as a child. There Erina discovers a shocking truth and makes a decision.

Cast
 Mao Inoue as Erina Akiyama
 Hiromi Nagasaku as Nonomiya Kiwako
 Eiko Koike as Chigusa Ando
 Tetsushi Tanaka as Takehiro Akiyama
 Yoko Moriguchi as Etsuko Akiyama
 Mitsuru Hirata as Yuzo Sawada
 Jun Fubuki as Masae Sawada
 Miwako Ichikawa as Kumi Sawada
 Kimiko Yo as Angel
 Min Tanaka as Taki
 Hitori Gekidan as Takashi Kishida
 Nahoko Yoshimoto as Yasue Nikawa

Awards and nominations

References

External links

2011 films
2010s Japanese-language films
2011 drama films
Japanese nonlinear narrative films
Picture of the Year Japan Academy Prize winners
Japanese drama films
Films based on Japanese novels
Films about child abduction in Japan
Works originally published in Japanese newspapers
Films directed by Izuru Narushima
Films with screenplays by Satoko Okudera
2010s Japanese films

ja:八日目の蝉#映画